Ustilaginomycetes is the class of true smut fungi. They are plant parasites with about 1400 recognised species in 70 genera. They have a simple septum with a septal pore cap, this is different from Agaricomycotina which has a dolipore septum with parenthoesome.
The group is monophyletic (has a common ancestor).

References

Ustilaginomycotina
Fungal plant pathogens and diseases
Fungus classes